Muhammad Abul Khair Kashfi (Urdu: سید محمد ابو الخیر کشفی) was a Pakistani author, researcher, critic, linguist and scholar of Urdu literature and linguistics.

Career
He remained associated with the University of Karachi as Professor and chairman in the Department of Urdu from 1958 to 1994. He was also a Visiting Professor at the Osaka University of Foreign Studies, Japan. After retirement Kashfi devoted his time to writing, guiding research, public speaking and media appearances.

Education
Kashfi earned M.A. and Ph.D degrees in Urdu from the University of Karachi in 1952 and 1971 respectively. The title of his doctoral dissertation was "The Historical and Political background of Urdu Poetry from 1707 to 1857 A.C." He also earned a master's degree in Teaching of English as a Second Language from Teachers' College, Columbia University, in 1968.

Books
His publications include:

 Hayat-e-Muhammadi: Quran-e-Majeed Ke Aaine Mayn ("The Life of Muhammad in the Mirror of the Qur’an"), Dada Bhai Foundation, Karachi.
 Urdu Sha’iri Ka Siyasi Aur Tarikhi Pasmanzar ("The Political and Historical Background of Urdu Poetry"), Adabi Publishers, Karachi.
 Hamare Ahed Ka Adab Aur Adeeb, Qamar Kitab Ghar, Karachi.
 Jadeed Urdu Adab Ke Do Tanqecdi Jaezay ("Two Critical Studies of Modern Urdu Literarture"), Urdu Academy Sind, Karaclii.
 Hamare Adabi Aur Lisani Masail ("Our Literary and Linguistic Problems"), Majlis-e-Matbuaat-o-Tahqiqaat-e-Urdu, Karachi.
 Yeh Log Bhi Ghazab Thay, Feroze Sons Lahore.
 Ghalib Ki Cheh Ghazlen ("Six Ghazals of Ghalib"), Urdu Academy Sindh, Karachi.
  Maulana Room (R.A) Aur Unki Kahaniyan (Tales of Maulana Room), Majlis e Nashariat e Islam

Awards
 Dawood Literary Award (1975), awarded for his book Urdu Sha’iri Ka Siyasi Aur Tarikhi Pasmanzar.
 National Seerat Award (1991), awarded for his book Hayat-e-Muhammadi - Quran-e-Majeed Ke Aaine Mayn by the Government of Pakistan
 Nishan-e-Azmat Award (1991)
 Quaid-e-Azam Adbi Award (1993)

References
 Books & Authors: Up, up and away, InpaperMagazine, Dawn, 3 October 2010

1932 births
2008 deaths
People from Kanpur
Muhajir people
Pakistani scholars
Pakistani literary critics
Linguists from Pakistan
Urdu-language writers
Linguists of Urdu
Urdu critics
University of Karachi alumni
Academic staff of Osaka University
Writers from Karachi
Pakistani lexicographers
20th-century linguists
20th-century lexicographers